Little Venice is an electoral ward of the City of Westminster. The population at the 2011 Census was 10,633. The ward covers the area south of Maida Vale and north of Paddington, bound by the Westway, Edgware Road and Grand Union canal. The Regent's Canal runs through the ward to Little Venice basin, and it is served by Warwick Avenue station on the Bakerloo line, in addition to several bus routes running through the area. There are three primary schools, St Joseph's RC Primary School, St Saviour's CofE Primary School and Ark Paddington Green Primary Academy, and one GP surgery in the ward.

The locality known as Little Venice was largely represented by the original Maida Vale ward, created in 1964, which elected five councillors. For the May 1978 election, the ward was split into two: Maida Vale and Little Venice, each electing three councillors. There were minor boundary changes in 2002 and 2022.

The ward currently returns three councillors to Westminster City Council, with an election every four years. At the last election in May 2022, two candidates from the Conservative Party and one from the Labour Party were elected to represent the ward.

Councillors 
Three councillors represent Little Venice ward. Notable councillors include Melvyn Caplan, leader of Westminster City Council (1995 to 2000) and deputy leader (until 2021), Jonathan Lord, MP for Woking and deputy leader of Westminster Council (1998 to 2000), Nick St Aubyn, former MP for Guildford (1997 to 2001), and Anne Weyman, vice-chair of Britain for Europe.

Election results  
Like the other wards of Westminster, Little Venice is represented by three councillors on Westminster City Council. The last election was held on 5 May 2022, when all three councillors were elected. Two councillors represent the Conservative Party and one represents the Labour Party. Candidates seeking re-election are marked with an asterisk (*).

2022 election

2018 election

2014 election

2010 election

2006 election

2002 election

1998 election

1994 election

1990 election

1986 election

1982 election

1978 election

See also 

 Maida Vale ward

References

External links 

 Westminster Conservative Party
 Westminster Labour Party

Wards in the City of Westminster